Sword fern is a common name for several ferns and may refer to:

Nephrolepis, a tropical genus of ferns, especially:
Nephrolepis exaltata, commonly cultivated as a houseplant, including the Boston fern
Polystichum, a cosmopolitan genus of ferns, especially:
Polystichum munitum, native to western North America
Giant swordfern